Khawaja Muhammad Islam is a politician from Faisalabad, Pakistan. He is affiliated with Pakistan Muslim League (N) and served as city president. He is a member of Pakistan Muslim League (N) provincial organising committee.  A businessman, who has been a Member of Provincial Assembly of Punjab between 1993 and 1996, and between 1997 and 1999; and has returned to the Punjab Assembly for a fourth term in general election of 2013. He has visited United Kingdom, Japan, India, Hong Kong, Bangkok and Malaysia. He represents PP-72 (Faisalabad-XXII).

On July 18, 2013, the Supreme Court of Pakistan, initiated criminal proceedings against Islam for holding a fake degree. His victory notification from PP-72 was also suspended.

References

External links
 Khawaja Muhammad Islam at the Provincial Assembly of the Punjab

Living people
Politicians from Punjab, Pakistan
People from Faisalabad
Pakistan Muslim League (N) politicians
Punjab MPAs 1993–1996
Punjab MPAs 1997–1999
Punjab MPAs 2013–2018
Year of birth missing (living people)